Methisazone (USAN) or metisazone (INN) is an antiviral drug that works by inhibiting mRNA and protein synthesis, especially in pox viruses. During trials in the 1960s it showed promising results against smallpox infection, but widespread use was considered logistically impractical in the developing countries facing smallpox cases, and it saw only limited use. In developed countries able to cope with the logistic challenge, treatment of smallpox could be achieved just as effectively with immunoglobulin therapy, without the severe nausea associated with metisazone.

Methisazone has been described as being used in prophylaxis since at least 1965.

The condensation of N-methylisatin with thiosemicarbazide leads to methisazone.

References

Antiviral drugs
Thioureas
Indolines
Lactams
Thiosemicarbazone
Oxindoles